Melanepalpus is a genus of parasitic flies in the family Tachinidae. There are at least three described species in Melanepalpus.

Species
These three species belong to the genus Melanepalpus:
 Melanepalpus albipes Townsend, 1914
 Melanepalpus fulvus Townsend, 1914
 Melanepalpus meraculus Reinhard, 1975

References

Further reading

 
 
 
 

Tachinidae
Articles created by Qbugbot